The Spanish tinge is an Afro-Latin rhythmic touch that spices up the more conventional  rhythms commonly used in jazz and pop music. The phrase is a quotation from Jelly Roll Morton. In his Library of Congress recordings, after referencing the influence of his own French Creole culture in his music, he noted the Spanish (read Cuban) presence:

What Morton called "Spanish" were the tresillo and habanera rhythms of the Cuban contradanza ("habanera"). Morton demonstrated the "tinge" to Alan Lomax in the 1938 Library of Congress recordings. What is known in Latin music as the habanera rhythm is also known as the congo, tango-congo, and tango.

Morton categorized his compositions in three groups: blues, stomps, and Spanish tinge, for those with habanera rhythms. Tunes with the "tinge" include "New Orleans Blues" (a.k.a. "New Orleans Joys"), "La Paloma", "The Crave", and "The Spanish Tinge".  Morton also called attention to the habanera in "Saint Louis Blues" as one of the elements in the song's success.

See also
Latin music in the United States

References

Further reading
 Mr. Jelly Roll: The Fortunes of Jelly Roll Morton, New Orleans Creole and "Inventor of Jazz" by  Alan Lomax.  Jelly Roll's autobiography, largely drawn from Jelly Roll Morton the Complete Library of Congress Recording.
 

Latin American music
Jazz techniques
Pop music
Rhythm and meter